Aahvanam is a 1997 Indian Telugu language film directed by S. V. Krishna Reddy. The film stars Srikanth, Ramya Krishna, and Heera Rajgopal. The film was inspired by the Telugu film Pelli Naati Pramanalu (1959), produced and directed by K. V. Reddy. The director remade the movie in English in 2012 as Divorce Invitation.

Synopsis
The film centers on Ravi Kumar, a man who believes money is the only important thing in life, even more than family ties and affection.  Once he goes to a village and plays a drama which results in his marriage with Rajeswari, a traditional woman from a wealthy family. They live happily for a while until Ravi runs into Sireesha, an even wealthier unmarried businesswoman. She falls in love with him, and Ravi, focused on her money, lies to her that he is married, but recently divorced. In order to marry Sireesha, Ravi files for divorce, devastating Rajeswari. Unwilling to lose her husband due to his greed, she tries in many different ways to change his mindset. When nothing works, Rajeswari accepts the divorce, but with the condition that her divorce be held as a grand ceremony, just as her marriage. At this event, Ravi realizes the importance and sanctity of marriage and apologizes to his wife.

Cast
 Srikanth as Ravi Kumar
 Ramya Krishna as Rajeswari
 Heera Rajagopal as Sireesha
 Ali as Cook
 Kaikala Satyanarayana as Satyanarayana
 Sakshi Ranga Rao as Shalabhayya
 Giri Babu as Ravi's father
 Shiva Parvathi as Ravi's mother
 Gautam Raju
 Bandla Ganesh as Ravi's brother
 Nirmalamma as Erukala Subbi
 Chalapathi Rao as Sireesha's uncle
 Jhansi

Soundtrack 
All songs were written by Sirivennela Seetharama Sastry, except for "Minsare Minsare" which was written by Bhuvana Chandra. The song "Minsare Minsare" was based on Johnny Wakelin's "In Zaire".

Reception 
Griddaluru Gopala Rao of Zamin Ryot gave the film a positive review praising the screenplay, music, and the performances of the cast. A critic from Andhra Today wrote, "If one glosses over the shortcomings of the climax, and enjoy the movie as an entertainer, 'Aahwanam' is a movie worth watching".

Awards
Nandi Awards
 1997 - Nandi Special Jury Award - S. V. Krishna Reddy

References

1997 films
Telugu films remade in other languages
Films directed by S. V. Krishna Reddy
Films scored by S. V. Krishna Reddy
1990s Telugu-language films
1997 drama films